The Assembly House is a Grade II listed public house at 292–294 Kentish Town Road, Kentish Town, London.

It was built in 1898 by Thorpe and Furniss.

References

External links
 

Grade II listed buildings in the London Borough of Camden
Grade II listed pubs in London
Kentish Town
Pubs in the London Borough of Camden